Greg Younging (sometimes written Young-Ing; 18 March 1961 – 3 May 2019) was a Canadian editor and expert on First Nations copyright. He was a member of the Opaskwayak Cree Nation. He was the managing editor at Theytus books and published "Elements of Indigenous Style: A Guidebook for Writing By and About Indigenous Peoples" in 2018. Younging died on 3 May 2019 in Penticton, British Columbia.

Personal life 
Younging was born on 18 March 1961. He was a member of Opsakwayak Cree Nation in Northern Manitoba. His mother is a residential school survivor and her experience of abuse influenced his decision to spend his career raising issues related to the impacts of colonization, and advocate for Indigenous knowledge.

Education
Younging earned a Bachelor of Arts and Masters of Arts Degree from Carleton University. He has a Master of Publishing Degree, from Simon Fraser University. He received a PhD from the University of British Columbia, Department of Educational Studies.

Younging's parents met in the Canadian military and Younging subsequently spent his childhood moving between Canadian bases. Because his father received training in electrical engineering and was posted to the Canadian Forces Base Lahr, he spent his teen years in Germany.

Career 
Younging had a number of different roles during his career.

Younging was the Managing Editor of Theytus Books from 1990 to 2003, returning to the role in 2016 until his death in 2019.

Younging served as assistant director of Research for the Canadian federal government's Truth and Reconciliation Commission (TRC) of Canada. He has worked for a number of other organizations including: The Royal Commission On Aboriginal Peoples, Assembly of First Nations, Committee Of Inquiry into Indian Education, Native Women's Association of Canada. He was member of Aboriginal Arts Advisory Committee of the Canada Council (1997–2001) and the British Columbia Arts Council (1999–2001).

As a professor at the University of British Columbia Okanagan, Younging had a profound impact on the university. He was a professor and Coordinator of the Indigenous Studies Program at the Irving K. Barber School of Arts and Sciences at the University of British Columbia–Okanagan. Younging was "instrumental in the development of the Indigenous Studies program." at the university.

He published numerous works, including nonfiction and poetry.

Awards
In June 2019, Younging was posthumously awarded the President's Award from the Association of Canadian Publishers for his contributions to the field.

Selected publications

References 

1961 births
2019 deaths
Cree people
Academic staff of the University of British Columbia Okanagan
Canadian editors
First Nations academics
20th-century First Nations writers
21st-century First Nations writers